Ravascletto is a comune (municipality) in the Province of Udine in the Italian region Friuli-Venezia Giulia, located about  northwest of Trieste and about  northwest of Udine.

Ravascletto borders the following municipalities: Cercivento, Comeglians, Ovaro, Paluzza, Sutrio.

Demographic evolution

References

External links

Cities and towns in Friuli-Venezia Giulia